The following are the records of Japan in Olympic weightlifting. Records are maintained in each weight class for the snatch lift, clean and jerk lift, and the total for both lifts by the Japan Weightlifting Association.

Current records

Men

Women

Historical records

Men (1998–2018)

Women (1998–2018)

Notes

References
General
Japanese records – Men 8 October 2022 updated
Japanese records – Women 22 January 2023 updated
Specific

External links
Japan Weightlifting Association

Records
Japan
Olympic weightlifting
Weightlifting